The New Charles River Run is an annual running event consisting of three simultaneous races, 5 km, 7.5 miles and 7.5 mile relay, which takes place in Boston, Watertown and Cambridge the last Sunday in June. Both courses are run entirely along the Charles River, making them extremely flat and fast.

In 2006, the starting and finishing lines were moved to their present location, the American Legion Marsh Post #442, 5 Greenough Boulevard, Cambridge. This location’s proximity to the Harvard Square MBTA station and a large parking lot at Artesani Park make it a convenient destination for both city and suburban runners.

A post-race party at the finish line features awards in 21 divisions, music, raffle, beer, barbecue, and ice cream.

The race has grown quickly, from 213 7 mile finishers and 126 5 km finishers in 2001 to 1097 7.5 mile finishers and 641 5 km finishers in 2008.

References

External links
New Charles River Run
Review on Cool Running

Annual events in Boston
Annual sporting events in the United States
Sports competitions in Boston
Massachusetts culture
5K runs in the United States
Sports in Cambridge, Massachusetts
Tourist attractions in Cambridge, Massachusetts
Watertown, Massachusetts